Ruy de Freitas, also commonly known as Tio Ruy  (24 August 1916 – 2 August 2012) was a Brazilian professional basketball player and coach, who competed in two consecutive Summer Olympics, starting in 1948. He was born in Brasília. At his first appearance in London he won the bronze medal with the Brazilian basketball team under the guidance of head coach Moacyr Daiuto.

References

External links
 Profile
 Profile

1916 births
2012 deaths
Brazilian basketball coaches
Brazilian men's basketball players
Olympic basketball players of Brazil
Basketball players at the 1948 Summer Olympics
Basketball players at the 1952 Summer Olympics
Olympic bronze medalists for Brazil
Olympic medalists in basketball
Medalists at the 1948 Summer Olympics
1950 FIBA World Championship players
Sportspeople from Brasília